William Mahoney (June 23, 1939 – December 16, 2021) was a Canadian ice hockey coach. He was head coach of the Minnesota North Stars from 1983 to 1985.

Born  in Peterborough, Ontario, he was a star multi-sport athlete. In addition to playing hockey, Mahoney was also a renowned lacrosse player, a Canadian football quarterback, and a softball pitcher. He was part of the Peterborough Shamrocks bantam "A" team, which won the 1953 provincial championship. In 1956, he became the first local native to play for the Peterborough Petes, and he served as captain of this junior "A" squad during the 1958 season. Mahoney later played university hockey at Carleton University in Ottawa and at McMaster University in Hamilton.

In 1963, Mahoney led the McMaster Marauders to becoming the first ever Canadian Intercollegiate Athletic Union (CIAU) ice hockey champions, at the inaugural CIAU University Cup tournament, also winning the first ever tournament Most Valuable Player award.

Although Mahoney never played pro hockey, he had a long coaching career, serving 16 years behind the bench with the McMaster University squads. In 1980, he was hired as an assistant coach with the Washington Capitals, but he was released as part of a 1981 clearing of the coaching staff. In 1982, he became coach of the Adirondack Red Wings of the AHL before gaining his position with Minnesota of the NHL.

In 1982, Mahoney was inducted to the Peterborough and District Sports Hall of Fame, for his combined achievements in both hockey and softball. He died on December 16, 2021 from complications of dementia, at the age of 82.

NHL Coaching record

References

External links

1939 births
2021 deaths
Adirondack Red Wings coaches
Canadian ice hockey coaches
Clinton Comets players
Sportspeople from Peterborough, Ontario
Minnesota North Stars coaches
Washington Capitals coaches
Ice hockey people from Ontario
Deaths from dementia in Canada